N-Ethyl-1,3-benzodioxolylpentanamine (EBDP; Ethyl-K; 3,4-methylenedioxy-N-ethyl-α-propylphenethylamine) is a psychoactive drug and member of the phenethylamine chemical class which acts as an entactogen, psychedelic, and stimulant. It is the N-ethyl analog of 1,3-benzodioxolylpentanamine (BDP; K). Ethyl-K was first synthesized by Alexander Shulgin. In his book PiHKAL ("Phenethylamines i Have Known And Loved"), the minimum dosage is listed as 40 mg and the duration is unknown. Very little is known about the pharmacology, pharmacokinetics, effects, and toxicity of Ethyl-K.

Legality

United Kingdom
This substance is a Class A drug in the Drugs controlled by the UK Misuse of Drugs Act.

See also 
 Methylbenzodioxolylpentanamine (MBDP; Methyl-K)
 Ethylbenzodioxolylbutanamine (EBDB; Ethyl-J)
 Ephylone (βk-Ethyl-K)

References

Psychedelic phenethylamines
Benzodioxoles